Eric Clarke or Clark may refer to:
Eric Clarke (footballer) (born 1957), Australian rules footballer
Eric Clarke (politician) (born 1933), British politician
Eric Clarke (musicologist) (born 1955), British academic
Eric "Fish" Clarke (born c. 1960), Jamaican reggae drummer
Eric Clark (politician) (born 1951), former Secretary of State of Mississippi
Eric D. Clark (born 1966), disco and house musician
Eric Clark (footballer) (1916–2008), Australian rules footballer